The Handball Federation of Russia commonly known by its acronym, HFR, is the national governing body of handball in Russia. Its headquarters are in Moscow, Russia, and its president is Sergey Shishkarev. HFR is responsible for the organization and governance of handball's major local championships in Russia, most notably the Russian Handball Super League (Russian: Чемпионат России Супер Лига), held since 1992.

After the launch of the 2022 Russian invasion of Ukraine, the European Handball Federation in February 2022 suspended Russia both in competitions for national teams and on club level.

History
In 1989 was held the first Constituent Conference of the Handball Union of Russia with participation of 32 members. As the General Director of the Union was elected Vladimir Salmanovich Maksimov, the Olympic Champion of 1976. In March 1992 in Volgograd was held the second Conference of the Handball Union of Russia. As the first President of the Union was elected Alexander Borisovich Kozhukhov. As the General Director and Vice-President was elected again Vladimir Salmanovich Maksimov. As the Vice-President Mr. Yuri Fedorovich Reznikov, the Honorary Master of Sport of the USSR. As the General Secretary Boris Nikolaevich Makarov.

The same year (1992), as the right successor of the former USSR Handball Federation, the Handball Union of Russia had become the equal member of the International Handball Federation (IHF) and of the European Handball Federation (EHF). And since that formation date the Handball Union of Russia hold annual tournaments and championships of Russia. Since 1993 Russia entered the national teams for participation at the Olympic Games, World and European Championships.

In reaction to the 2022 Russian invasion of Ukraine, the International Handball Federation banned Russian and Belarus athletes and officials, and the European Handball Federation suspended the national teams of Russia and Belarus as well as Russian and Belarusian clubs competing in European handball competitions. Referees, officials, and commission members from Russia and Belarus will not be called upon for future activities. And new organisers will be sought for the YAC 16 EHF Beach Handball EURO and the Qualifier Tournaments for the Beach Handball EURO 2023, which were to be held in Moscow.  In addition, it refused to allow competitions to be held in Russia. The Russian Handball Federation failed in its appeal against the decision to exclude Russia's teams from continental competition, which was rejected by the European Handball Federation Court of Handball.

Competitions
The Handball Union of Russia conducts two competitions for both Men and Women teams:

 Russian Handball Super League - For handball premier league clubs.
 Russian Handball League 1 - For handball Second Division clubs.

Honorary President of the HUR
See: Alexander Borisovich Kozhukhov

Awards

Hans Baumann Trophy
The Handball Union of Russia was awarded with the highest order of the International Handball Federation (IHF) – Hans Baumann Trophy for the great contribution to the world development of this sport for the first time.

The Trophy is kept at the head-office of the Handball Union of Russia, together with five prizes of the European Handball Federation as the best country by sports results.

Best handballers of Russia in the 20th century
In 2001, the congress as well as the members of the executive committee of the Handball Union of Russia named the best Russian handballers of the 20th century. The voting results were:

75-year anniversary of Russian handball

In 2003, the Handball Union of Russia celebrated the 75-Year Anniversary of Russian handball. In many regions of Russia there were held special events to celebrate the jubilee. As the final chord was the organization of the match for men teams Russia national handball team and the World Selection. The match took place in Dynamo Sports Palace, Moscow.

Scorers list

Line-up

References

External links
 
 Handball Union of Russia at eurohandball.com

Handball in Russia
Russia
Handball
Sports organizations established in 1989